Willie Tyler (born September 8, 1940) is an American ventriloquist, comedian and actor. Tyler has been credited as Willie Tyler and Lester or Willie Tyler & Lester. Willie Tyler recorded "Cannibal" for Motown Records in 1968, but it was not released. He has appeared in many television commercials, sitcoms and films. Tyler got his first big break in 1972 on Rowan & Martin's Laugh-In.

Appearances

The duo made an early appearance at the Harlem Cultural Festival in the summer of 1969, and can be briefly seen in the 2021 documentary Summer of Soul.

Tyler has had guest roles in The Parent 'Hood, Pacific Blue, What's Happening Now!!, The White Shadow and The Jeffersons, as well as serving as host of the Saturday morning children's anthology series ABC Weekend Specials throughout the early 1980s.  He appeared in the 1978 film Coming Home. In addition, he has appeared in television commercials in the 1980s for McDonald's, Toyota, Hires Root Beer, and Rent-A-Center.

 He appeared as himself in the 2004 BET Comedy Awards, Frank McKlusky, C.I., For Da Love of Money, In the House, the 4th Annual Black Gold Awards, The 1st Annual Soul Train Music Awards, Motown Returns to the Apollo, Lou Rawls Parade of Stars, Powerhouse, The White Shadow, American Bandstand, The Electric Company, Vegetable Soup, The Flip Wilson Show, The Super Dave Osborne Show, The Statler Brothers Show, The Hollywood Palace, Match Game and Family Feud, as well as a number of other variety programs. On September 18, 2006, Tyler was the first ventriloquist to appear on the Late Show with David Letterman'''s Ventriloquist Week. In 2009, Willie Tyler and Lester were featured in the ventriloquist comedy documentary I'm No Dummy, directed by Bryan W. Simon. On May 21, 2019, Tyler appeared as a 1972 TV version of himself on the  ABC sitcom  The Kids are Alright.

Notes

External links
Official website

An Interview with Willie Tyler Part One, February 2012
An Interview with Willie Tyler Part Two, February 2012
Willie Tyler at Richard De La Font Agency
Willie Tyler at Funny Business Agency
Willie Tyler on Tom Green Live''

1940 births
Living people
African-American male actors
American male actors
Ventriloquists
People from Covington County, Alabama
ABC Weekend Special
Culture of Detroit